The 1982 Troy State Trojans football team represented Troy State University (now known as Troy University) as a member of the Gulf South Conference (GSC) during the 1982 NCAA Division II football season. Led by seventh-year head coach Charlie Bradshaw, the Trojans compiled an overall record of 2–8, with a mark of 2–5 in conference play, and finished seventh in the GSC.

Schedule

References

Troy State
Troy Trojans football seasons
Troy State Trojans football